Tmesisternus geniculatus is a species of beetle in the family Cerambycidae. It was described by Stephan von Breuning 1948.

References

geniculatus
Beetles described in 1948